Thomas J. Near is an American evolutionary ichthyologist who is currently a Professor and Chair of the Department of Ecology and Evolutionary Biology at Yale University as well as the Bingham Oceanographic Curator of Ichthyology at the Peabody Museum of Natural History. Since 2015, Near has been Head of Saybrook College, one of Yale University's residential colleges.  (The title was originally "Master" but this was replaced with "Head" in 2016.)

Taxon described by him
See :Category:Taxa named by Thomas J. Near

References

Living people
1969 births
Northern Illinois University alumni
Yale University faculty
Evolutionary biologists
Ichthyologists
American ichthyologists